Big Fat Gypsy Weddings is a British documentary series broadcast on Channel 4, that explored the lives and traditions of several British Traveller families as they prepared to unite one of their members in marriage. The series also featured Romanichal (British Gypsies) in several episodes, and has been criticised by some Romani for not accurately representing England’s Romani and Travelling community. It was first broadcast in February 2010 as a one-off documentary called My Big Fat Gypsy Wedding, filmed as part of the Cutting Edge series and voted Most Groundbreaking Show in the Cultural Diversity Awards 2010. A series of 5 episodes were later commissioned, and the series first aired in January 2011. A second series began airing in February 2012. A third series was not commissioned, rather the show ended with eleven stand-alone specials.

In North America, the show airs on TLC under the title My Big Fat Gypsy Wedding, with the original narration by Barbara Flynn replaced by Ellen K., while the TLC network started airing a spin-off featuring American Roma called My Big Fat American Gypsy Wedding.

Reception 
The show has been criticised mainly by the Irish Traveller & British Gypsy/Traveller communities for misrepresenting them. Jane Jackson of the Rural Media Company (publishers the Travellers' Times) said: 
Executive Producer Jes Wilkins said: 
Billy Welch, a spokesman for Romani Gypsies, said: 
During the episode No Place Like Home, Big Fat Gypsy Weddings had 4 of the top 10 trending topics worldwide on social networking website Twitter.

In June 2011, TLC rebroadcast the show and was filming a U.S. version.

Ratings 
Big Fat Gypsy Weddings opened in 2011. The second episode got 7.4m viewers at its peak. It was the eighth highest rating in Channel 4's history. The final episode was watched by 6.5 million viewers, easily beating the 2011 BRIT Awards which had an average viewership of 4.8 million.

Controversies 
The series has faced a number of controversies, including allegations of racism in its advertising and instigating a rise in the rate of racially motivated bullying.

The episode "No Place Like Home" caused controversy after it showed young girls provocatively dancing and wearing full make-up.

Awards 
Broadcast readers voted the series' progenitor, My Big Fat Gypsy Wedding, the 'Most Groundbreaking Programme' at the Cultural Diversity Awards 2010. Executive producer Jes Wilkins and creator and Producer Jenny Popplewell were in attendance to accept the award.

Big Fat Gypsy Wedding Series 1 was nominated for a BAFTA in the YouTube Audience Vote category.

Episodes

My Big Fat Gypsy Wedding (2010)

Series 1

Royal wedding special (2011)

Christmas special (2011)

Series 2

Stand-alone specials
Channel 4 confirmed there would not be a third series of Big Fat Gypsy Weddings but instead would end the show with six stand-alone specials that were to be aired throughout 2013. Despite this, eleven specials have aired to date.

The eighth special, called Big Fat Gypsy Christmas: Carols and Caravans on the website's official episode guide, features the same title card and animation as My Big Fat Gypsy Christmas, the last episode of the first season. This often leads to confusion between the two.

The latest special to air was titled My Big Fat Gypsy Grand National, this was shown on 6 April 2015.

References

External links 
Big Fat Gypsy Weddings at Channel4.com
Big Fat Gypsy Weddings at Firecracker Films
 

2010 British television series debuts
2015 British television series endings
British documentary television series
Cutting Edge (TV series) episodes
Documentaries about weddings
English-language television shows
Wedding television shows
Works about Irish Travellers
Irish Travellers in the United Kingdom